Somatostatin receptor type 1 is a protein that in humans is encoded by the SSTR1 gene.

Function 

Somatostatin acts at many sites to inhibit the release of many hormones and other secretory proteins. The biological effects of somatostatin are probably mediated by a family of G protein-coupled receptors that are expressed in a tissue-specific manner. The encoded protein is a member of the superfamily of somatostatin receptors having seven transmembrane segments, and is expressed in highest levels in jejunum and stomach.

See also 
 Somatostatin receptor

References

Further reading

External links 
 
 

G protein-coupled receptors